C. Leon King High School is a Tampa, Florida public high school named in honor of C. Leon King, a member of the Hillsborough County Board of Public Instruction for 18 years. It opened in 1960 with 58 faculty members and 960 students. It is located at 6815 North 56th Street in Tampa, Florida 33610.

King High School, a part of Hillsborough County Public Schools, is a traditional/hybrid magnet school. It has one of five International Baccalaureate programs in Hillsborough County, Florida. The IB program of King began in July 1994. Ninety eight percent of IB seniors earned the IB Diploma in 2014—one of the highest rates in the United States.  For the 2010–2011 school year, King High School received an A grade in education overall. , King High has been rated a "B".

Its student population was 1,889 in 2014–15 and the attendance rate was 92% in 2005.

History
The school was built on the site of Ridgewood Cemetery, a municipal cemetery for poor African-Americans established in 1942. Hillsborough County Public Schools acquired  of land for the school from a private company in 1959, and that company bought the site from the City of Tampa in 1957; the cemetery is in that plot and became used for agricultural classes. In 2019, officials discovered graves of 145 people.

Academics
King High School hosts an International Baccalaureate (IB) Program, which began in 1994. King High also offers advanced placement courses (KAPS).

The school has various academic clubs. The speech and debate team competes at various statewide and national NSDA events. The math club Mu Alpha Theta has won the county math bowl 22 times and competes at regional and statewide events. The science bowl team competes at science bowl and Science Olympiad. The math and science clubs administer the qualifying examinations for the various international science olympiads. Other academic clubs include HOSA and FBLA.

The IB Program offers various standard level (SL) and higher level (HL) IB courses in subjects such as English, history, mathematics, physics, chemistry, and biology.

Student Government
The Student Government Association has a structure similar to the federal government system.

Sports
Fall:
 Football
 Boys Golf
 Girls Golf
 Boys Cross Country
 Girls Cross Country
 Swimming
 Volleyball

Winter:
 Boys Basketball
 Girls Basketball
 Wrestling
 Boys Soccer
 Girls Soccer

Spring:
 Baseball
 Softball
 Flag Football
 Track
 Tennis

Music programs
King High School has multiple musical programs such as Chorus and Show Choir (PRIDE), a Marching Band (Marching Lions), Concert Band, Symphonic Band, Wind Ensemble, and a Concert Orchestra. King High School's Marching Band received Superior ratings at the annual FBA competition for 45 consecutive years and is often invited to perform in the State's band events. The show choir, PRIDE, is one of the top show choirs in the state. The dance team (Lionettes) have one of the most talented and culturally diverse teams in the county.

Notable alumni
 
Musa Abdul-Aleem, professional basketball player
Mike Awesome, 1984, former WWF Champion
Derek Bell, former professional baseball player
Pam Bondi, 1984, Florida Attorney General
Tim Crews, former professional baseball player
Ty Griffin, former professional baseball player
Eric Hayes, former NFL football player
Pam Iorio, 1977, former Mayor of Tampa
Gary Koch, 1970, former professional golfer and ESPN sportscaster
Jim Morrison, former professional baseball player
Edmund Nelson, 1978, former professional football player, graduated in 1978
Audrey O'Brien Nelson, 1973, director of VISN 8 at the James A. Haley Veterans Hospital and prominent research scientist
Henry Paul, musician formerly with the Outlaws
George Peoples, 1978, former professional football player
Calvin Pickering, 1995, former professional baseball player

References

External links
 Official website
 SDHC website
 International Baccalaureate website
 Great Schools

Educational institutions established in 1960
High schools in Tampa, Florida
Public high schools in Florida
1960 establishments in Florida